Lima Township may refer to:

 Lima Township, Adams County, Illinois
 Lima Township, LaGrange County, Indiana
 Lima Township, Michigan
 Lima Township, Cass County, Minnesota
 Lima Township, Licking County, Ohio, now part of the city of Pataskala

See also 
 Rock Creek-Lima Township, Carroll County, Illinois

Township name disambiguation pages